An awards ceremony is a type of ceremony where awards are given out. The ceremony may be arranged by a government organization, a society, a school, a trade association or even a company that specializes in running awards ceremonies. Typically a master of ceremonies presents award winners, speaks to the audience, entertains people, and generally keeps the ceremony moving.

Ancient Greece

The Ancient Greeks held annual competitions for tragedy and comedy, financed by the wealthiest citizens.
Awards were given out for best play, best producer and best actor.
In the early Olympic Games there were two awards ceremonies.
After each event the judges gave palm branches to the winners.
On the last day of the games all the event winners were announced, and were crowned with olive garlands.
No medals were given, and only the winner was announced, since the runners-up were not considered significant.
It was not unusual for the athletes to risk heavy fines and to bribe the judges to be declared winners.

Modern ceremonies

Components of a modern awards ceremony typically include:
A defined and equitable method of choosing the winners
A venue, which may be a hotel, theatre or other facility. Dinner and entertainment may also be provided to attendees.
A master of ceremonies
Technical equipment such as microphones, speakers and video projectors
Invitations to selected attendees
Arrangements for journalists to cover the ceremony
Certificates or trophies for the winners

American media awards

The major American media awards have evolved into major prime-time television ceremonies, but had small beginnings. The first awards by the Academy of Motion Picture Arts and Sciences were held in 1929 at the Hollywood Roosevelt Hotel three months after the winners had been announced. The Oscar statuettes for best movie, best actress and best actor were given out in a 15-minute ceremony. The Golden Globe Awards were founded in 1944 by eight journalists who had formed the Hollywood Foreign Correspondents Association. They arranged for a luncheon at 20th Century Fox where scrolls were given for best picture, best actress and best actor. The Tony Awards for theatrical plays and musicals were first presented at the Waldorf Astoria New York in 1947. The Academy of Television Arts & Sciences presented the first Emmy Awards at the Hollywood Athletic Club in 1949. The first Grammy Awards were given by the National Academy of Recording Arts and Sciences in 1958, with Volare winning the Best Single award. The first Nickelodeon Kids' Choice Awards were presented in 1988. The Game Awards, an award show dedicated to the video game industry, has been livestreamed on YouTube and Twitch annually since its inception in 2014.

Major English-language entertainment awards ceremonies in January/February/March of each year now include the Academy Awards, American Cinema Editors, American Society of Cinematographers, Art Directors Guild, British Academy of Film and Television Arts, Costume Designers Guild, Critics Choice, Directors Guild of America, Grammy Awards, Independent Spirit Awards, New York Film Critics Circle, Nickelodeon Kids' Choice Awards, Producers Guild of America, Screen Actors Guild, and Writers Guild of America. The Game Awards are livestreamed in December of each year.

See also

 Lists of awards

References

Sources

External links
 

Ceremonies
Ceremony